Anthony Howell (born 27 June 1971) is an English actor, best known for his starring role as Sgt. Paul Milner in the British TV series Foyle's War and  Margit/Morgott in Elden Ring.

Early years

Howell was born in the Lake District. He trained to be an actor at the Drama Centre in North London. His acting debut came when he began a world tour with Robert Lepage's stage play The Geometry of Miracles.

Career 
He subsequently starred in the BBC four-part series Wives and Daughters (1999) before joining the 2000 Royal Shakespeare Company season in Stratford-Upon-Avon, where he took leading roles in the three main plays of that year: Orlando in As You Like It, Benvolio in Romeo and Juliet and Antipholous of Ephesus in The Comedy of Errors, playing opposite David Tennant.

After leaving the RSC in 2001 he filmed three TV series; Ultimate Force, Helen West and Foyle's War, where he would spend almost a decade working alongside Michael Kitchen and Honeysuckle Weeks.

During the months he wasn't filming Foyle's War, he returned to the theatre in the UK.
In 2005, Howell starred in Agatha Christie's And Then There Were None in London's West End. He played the lead in the first stage adaptation of John Fowles's The French Lieutenant's Woman which toured the UK in 2006. In 2008, Howell appeared in the Primavera production of Jingo: A Farce of War by Charles Wood at London's Finborough Theatre, then toured with the Peter Hall company in an adaptation of Henry James's Portrait of a Lady and Ibsen's A Doll's House.

In 2010, he played Gordon Way in the BBC TV adaptation of Dirk Gently (which was loosely based upon the books by Douglas Adams).
Later that year he joined Shakespeare's Globe to perform in Henry VIII, and also in the world premiere of Howard Brenton's Anne Boleyn playing the role of a young Henry VIII opposite Miranda Raison as Anne, roles they both reprised at the Globe in the following year.
Two years later he played Trigorin in a new adaptation of Chekhov's The Seagull by Evening Standard Award winning writer, Anya Reiss at the Southwark Playhouse.

He also played Jean Neuhaus, a Belgian chocolatier in a Season 2 episode of Mr Selfridge.

Howell filmed Dracula in Budapest, an NBC Universal series starring Jonathan Rhys Meyers. He also voices Victor Belmont in the 2014 video game Castlevania: Lords of Shadow 2, as well as providing the motion capture for the protagonist, Dracula. He also provided the voice and motion capture for Weyland-Yutani employee Christopher Samuels in the 2014 survival horror game, Alien: Isolation.

In the summer seasons of 2014 and 2015 he appeared on the stage of the Globe in London, in 2014 as Cassius in Shakespeare's Julius Caesar and in 2015 as Bishop Santa Cruz in Helen Edmundson's The Heresy of Love.

In 2017, he played Cliff in the horror film Widow's Walk.

In 2018, BBC Radio 4 aired a five part drama called The Unforgiven. Set in 1984, this was a prequel to the BBC One television series Waking the Dead, which ran from 2000–2011. The Unforgiven is written by Waking the Dead's creator, Barbara Machin, and features the original cast, the exception being Trevor Eve who played Detective Superintendent Peter Boyd in the TV series. Howell was cast in the role of Detective Constable Peter Boyd for the radio series.

Theatre

Filmography

Television

Video games

Film

Discography

References

External links

1971 births
Living people
English male film actors
English male stage actors
English male video game actors
English cinematographers
English male television actors
21st-century English male actors
English male Shakespearean actors
Royal Shakespeare Company members
Alumni of the Drama Centre London